Alf McDonald was a college football player.

Georgia Tech
He was a prominent quarterback and punter for John Heisman's Georgia Tech Golden Tornado football team of the Georgia Institute of Technology.

1912
McDonald was selected All-Southern by Harold Ketron in 1912.

1913
McDonald was elected captain for 1914, but did not attend that year.

See also 

 List of Georgia Tech Yellow Jackets starting quarterbacks

References

American football halfbacks
American football quarterbacks
American football punters
Georgia Tech Yellow Jackets football players
All-Southern college football players